The Grand Council of Grisons is the legislature of the Canton of Grisons. It meets in Chur and is composed of 120 members.

References

Grisons